Tyler McCreary (born April 9, 1993 in Toledo, Ohio) is an American boxer in the featherweight division. McCreary is currently ranked #5 in the world by the WBA in the featherweight division.

Amateur career 
McCreary began boxing at the age of 10 and held an amateur record of 87-15 (46 KO’s). He won the Title National Championship in 2009 and 2010. McCreary also captured a bronze medal at the Under-19 National Championships, was a two-time Toledo Golden Gloves Champion and won an Ohio State Junior Olympics Championship.

Professional career 
McCreary has a professional record of 16–2–1 (7 KO's). He is promoted by Jay Z's Roc Nation Sports and has been called by boxing media "Boxing's next best thing." McCreary is trained by Lamar Wright.

On October 8, 2015 McCreary overcame the toughest test of his career when he won a unanimous decision over  Colombian, and former WBA world ranked contender, Manuel de los Reyes Herrera in Rochester, New York.

Philanthropy 
McCreary is active in community projects in his hometown of Toledo; including donating his time to a local food bank.

References

External links
 
 Roc Nation Profile

Boxers from Ohio
Sportspeople from Toledo, Ohio
1993 births
Living people
American male boxers
Featherweight boxers